The Monument aux Morts de Montauban is an 1894 bronze sculpture by Antoine Bourdelle. His romantic vision of the monument generated many violent oppositions. Auguste Rodin's intervention in 1897 enabled Bourdelle to do this sculpture without any compromise. The monument was erected in Montauban, in the department of Tarn-et-Garonne, in 1902.

Bibliography
 Dossier de l'Art N° 10 de January/February 1993
 Bourdelle by Ionel Jianou and Michel Dufet Edition Arted 1970
 Jardin-musée départemental Bourdelle d'Égreville by Hervé Joubeaux - Conservateur territorial du Patrimoine in May 2005

References

1894 sculptures
Sculptures by Antoine Bourdelle
Monuments and memorials in France
Bronze sculptures in France
Statues in France